"I've Never Met a Nice South African" is a satirical song originating in a sketch on the British television series Spitting Image (series 2, episode 5). It was written by John Lloyd and Peter Brewis and was sung by Andy Roberts. In 1986 it was commercially released as the B-side of the chart-topping "The Chicken Song". When the song was recorded, South Africa was still under the apartheid regime and widely considered to be a pariah state as a result.

The song is narrated in the music video by a seasoned expatriate traveller who describes a number of experiences that are unlikely ("I met a man in Katmandu who claimed to have two willies"), fantastical ("I've seen unicorns in Burma and a Yeti in Nepal"), absurd ("I've had a close encounter of the 22nd kind, that's when an alien spaceship disappears up your behind"), nonsensical ("I've danced with ten foot pygmies"), outright impossible ("I've had sunstroke in the Arctic and a swim in Timbuktu"), or humorously defy stereotypes ("[I've met a] working Yorkshire miner") to a bored bartender (Lord Lucan), stressing at the end of each verse that, despite all these exotic experiences, he has never met a nice South African.

The chorus is sung by a number of gun-toting white South Africans and a sheep, out on safari wearing Springbok jerseys, who bluntly describe themselves in a variety of insulting ways, such as "arrogant bastards who hate black people", "ignorant loud-mouths with no sense of humour" and "talentless murderers who smell like baboons". As the song progresses, dead animals are piled up on their Land Rover and the barman becomes ever sleepier before collapsing on the floor.

In the closing verse, the South African chorus names writer and anti-apartheid activist Breyten Breytenbach, exceptionally, as "quite a nice South African" who has "hardly ever killed anyone," and say "that's why we put him in prison". At the time Breytenbach had, as the song points out, been living in exile in Paris and had been previously imprisoned by the South African regime for his interracial marriage.

References

External links
 "(I've Never Met) A Nice South African - a Song by Spitting Image", h2g2, 29 March 2005. Analysis of the lyrics.
 "I've Never Met A Nice South African music video

1986 songs
Comedy songs
Satirical songs
International opposition to apartheid in South Africa
Protest songs
Songs against racism and xenophobia
Spitting Image songs
Songs about South Africa
Songs about white people
Anti-apartheid songs
Music videos featuring puppetry